Ilyukhin is a Russian masculine surname, its feminine counterpart is Ilyukhina. It may refer to
Mikhail Ilyukhin (born 1966), Russian mixed martial artist 
Viktor Ilyukhin (1949–2011), Russian politician
 Yekaterina Ilyukhina (born 1987), Russian snowboarder
Yelena Ilyukhina (born 1982), Kazakhstani handball player

Russian-language surnames